The 2018–19 season was Dundee United's 110th season, having been founded as Dundee Hibernian in 1909. It was their third season in the Scottish Championship, having been relegated from the Scottish Premiership at the end of the 2015–16 season. United also competed in the Challenge Cup, League Cup and Scottish Cup.

Summary

Management
United began the season under the management of Csaba László, who had signed an 18–month contract the previous season. On 30 September 2018, following a 5–1 home defeat to promotion rivals Ross County, László left his position as manager by way of “mutual agreement".  On 8 October, former Hearts manager Robbie Neilson was appointed as United’s new head coach. His first match in charge was a 2–1 victory away to Partick Thistle and Neilson stated that he felt he could replicate his success at Hearts and lead Dundee United back to the Scottish Premiership.

Results and fixtures

Scottish Championship

Premiership play-offs

Scottish League Cup

Group Stage Matches

Scottish Challenge Cup

Scottish Cup 

As a top four finisher in the SPFL Championship for the 2017-18 season, Dundee United entered the 2018-19 Scottish Cup in the fourth round, played over the weekend of 19 January 2019.

Squad statistics
The table below shows the number of appearances and goals scored by each player.

Appearances

|-
|colspan="12"|Players who left the club during the 2017–18 season
|-

|}

Team statistics

League table

League cup table

Transfers

Players in

Players out

Loans in

Loans out

References

Scottish football clubs 2018–19 season
2018-19